Salvatore Simoncini (Late 19th century) was an Italian painter, mainly of genre themes.

He was born and resided in Palermo. Among his works were:
Minaccia temporale (1877, Mostra Nazionale of Fine Arts in Naples, oil on canvas.)
After Fishing (1882, Florence)
Mount Aetna, from near Catania(1882, Florence),
Church San Salvatore in Catania (1884, Expositions of Fine Arts, Turin)
The mountains of the Guadagna at midday from Palermo (1884, Expositions of Fine Arts, Turin)

References

19th-century Italian painters
Italian male painters
Italian genre painters
Painters from Palermo
19th-century Italian male artists